The Outsider is the second album by East Coast rapper CL Smooth. The album is considered to be a companion to his previous album American Me. In addition to exclusive remixes, The Outsider also has new songs, as well as audio versions of songs performed live.

Track listing

External links
 CL Smooth official site

CL Smooth albums
2007 albums
Albums produced by John Legend